Anup Kumar may refer to:

 Anoop Kumar (1926–1997), Indian film actor who appeared over seventy Bollywood films; brother of Ashok Kumar and Kishore Kumar
 Anup Kumar (actor) (1932–1998), Bengali film actor
 Anup Kumar (kabaddi) (born 1983), Indian Kabaddi player
 Anoop Kumar (Tamil actor), Tamil film actor
 Anup Kumar (politician), Fiji Indian politician

See also